Bruce Eugene (born June 20, 1982) is a former American football quarterback who is currently a college football coach. He played college football for and graduated from Grambling State University.

College career
Standing six feet (1.83 m) tall, and weighing over 260 lb Eugene was given the nickname "Round Mound of Touchdown". He was much heavier than the typical quarterback, but proved to be exceptionally quick and agile for a man his size.  He was also a very accurate passer, and was rated one of the top players in Division I-AA college football.

Injured in the first game of the 2004 season, Eugene sat out the entire remainder of the year.  He received a sixth year of eligibility from the NCAA.

Eugene was a three-time finalist for the coveted Walter Payton Award, which is given annually to I-AA's top football player (the equivalent of the Heisman Trophy in Division I-A). In 2003, he threw for 3,805 yards with 34 TD vs 13 INT.  He also ran for 412 yards with 6 TD.  He followed that up with an amazing performance during the 2005 season throwing for 4,408 yards with 56 TD vs 6 INT while running for an additional 157 yards and 3 TD.

At the NFL combine, Eugene recorded a score of 41 on the Wonderlic test, one of the highest ever.

Professional career
Eugene was signed as a free agent by the New Orleans Saints within hours of the conclusion of the 2006 NFL Draft. Bruce was released from the Saints on June 15, 2006. After a short stint with the Canadian Football League's Saskatchewan Roughriders he signed with the Tampa Bay Buccaneers on January 11, 2007.

Eugene was assigned to the Frankfurt Galaxy of the now-defunct NFL Europa for the 2007 season. Frankfurt Galaxy was at the time the defending World Bowl champion. At the end of training camp, Eugene was released by Frankfurt, then acquired by 3-time World Bowl champions Berlin Thunder, where he replaced third-string quarterback Walter Washington, who was released after camp, and injured back-up Omar Jacobs. He played his first game for Thunder in the 7–16 loss to the Hamburg Sea Devils on April 22, 2007.

Coaching career
Eugene moved into coaching, working at different schools in the Public Schools Athletic League (PSAL) in New York City.  In 2011, he was the quarterbacks coach  at Alcorn State University in Lorman, Mississippi.  In 2012, he returned to PSAL as the head football coach at High School of Enterprise, Business, & Technology (also known as Grand Street Campus or Grand Street) in Brooklyn, New York.

In 2014, WGNO named him one of the best high school quarterbacks who played in the New Orleans metro in any of the previous 23 years.  Eugene was a star quarterback at Walter Cohen High School of New Orleans.

In December 2015, Eugene became the first African-American coach to win the Public Schools Athletic League (PSAL) football city championship at the highest level.  His team (Grand Street) defeated Eramus Hall 28–26 at Yankee Stadium.  The New York Jets organization named him the 2015 "High School Coach Of The Year" and awarded his team $4,000.

In October 2016 Eugene was removed from his head coaching position at Grand Street after repeated violations of the PSAL code of conduct.

References

External links
ESPN Profile
https://web.archive.org/web/20070102093541/http://www.thenewsstar.com/apps/pbcs.dll/article?AID=%2F20060615%2FSPORTS%2F60615001%2F1006
Alcorn State University Football - Coaching Staff

1982 births
Living people
Players of Canadian football from New Orleans
Players of American football from New Orleans
American football quarterbacks
Grambling State University alumni
Grambling State Tigers football players
New Orleans Saints players
Saskatchewan Roughriders players
Berlin Thunder players
Tampa Bay Buccaneers players
Alcorn State Braves football coaches